Mulla Morad ibn Ali Khan Tafreshi (1549-1641 CE) was a Persian theologian and jurist during the Safavid period. Tafreshi was a contemporary of Mulla Sadra Shirazi. 

He received religious instruction from Amoli, and Mirza Abraham Hamadani. Ardabili also mentioned the name of Tafreshi I in the book of Summa Narrations. Tafreshi left many books on theology and jurisprudence. Some of his writings about philosophy and theology include:
 Arrazyyah al-mahdavyyah
 Arrazyyah al-Husaynyyah
 Amoozaj al-mousavi
 Treaties on discussion

References

 Seyyed Mohsen Amin, the great figures of Shiites, volum:10. p116
 Agha bozorg Tehrani, azzariah on Shiites writing, vol: 2.p. 408-401/vol:11.p:241

1549 births
1641 deaths
17th-century Muslim theologians
16th-century writers of Safavid Iran
17th-century writers of Safavid Iran
Safavid theologians
16th-century Muslim theologians
16th-century Iranian people
17th-century Iranian people